Janthina janthina is a species of holoplanktonic sea snail, a marine gastropod mollusk in the family Epitoniidae. Its common names include violet sea-snail, common violet snail, large violet snail and purple storm snail.

Distribution
This species is found worldwide in the warm waters of tropical and temperate seas, floating at the surface. More specifically, the species is located in the tropical and subtropical Atlantic, Indian and Pacific oceans. They are often found in large groups and sometimes become stranded on beaches when they are blown ashore by strong winds. The snails are a unique part of the neuston, organisms which live on or near the surface of the water, because of their relatively large size. They have veliger, or free swimming larvae, but the adults do not swim, and cannot create their rafts, except at the surface where air bubbles are available.

Habitat

These snails are pelagic, drifting on the surface of the ocean, where they feed upon pelagic hydrozoa, especially the by-the-wind sailor, Velella velella, and the Portuguese man o' war, Physalia physalis.

Description
J. janthina is a member of the family Janthinidae, snails that trap air bubbles to maintain their positions at the surface of the ocean, where they are predators on hydrozoa. The air bubbles are stabilized by the secretion of amphiphilic mucins which have evolved from epitoniid egg masses. This passive flotation is a particularly resource-efficient form of animal locomotion. In addition to the bubble raft, only the veliger, or larval stage, has an operculum, and the shell is paper-thin to allow the animal to float upside down at the surface.

The snail's shell is reverse countershaded, because of its upside-down position in the water column. There is a light purple shade on the spire of the shell, and a darker purple on the ventral side. The animal has a large head on a very flexible neck. The eyes are small and are situated at the base of its tentacles. The shell, which is violet, with a paler upper surface, is almost smooth, with a slightly depressed-globose shape. It is thin and delicate, and is without an operculum. The height of the species shell is up to 38 mm, the width to 40 mm.

The snail begins life as a male and later changes into a female. The eggs are held by the female until they develop into the larval form.

References

External links
 Species Spotlight: Janthina janthina - Bermuda Department of Conservation Services

Epitoniidae
Gastropods described in 1758
Taxa named by Carl Linnaeus